The Cleveland Subdivision is a railroad line owned and operated by CSX Transportation in the U.S. state of Ohio. The line runs from a junction with the CL&W Subdivision at Lester northeast across the Short Line Subdivision near Brook Park to a terminus near Brooklyn along a former Baltimore and Ohio Railroad line.

History
The entire line was built in the 1890s as a branch of the Cleveland, Lorain and Wheeling Railway, whose main line is now the CL&W Subdivision. It became part of the B&O and CSX through leases and mergers.

References

CSX Transportation lines
Rail infrastructure in Ohio
Baltimore and Ohio Railroad lines
Rail transportation in Cleveland